Kranji Reservoir (Chinese: 克兰芝蓄水池) is a reservoir in the northern part of Singapore, near the Straits of Johor.  It was a former freshwater river that flowed out into the sea that was dammed at its mouth to form a freshwater reservoir. It can also be classified as an estuary. The dam has a road bridging the two banks, and now prevents the sea from coming in, and is home to a marsh.
The former Kranji River has three main tributaries - Sungei Peng Siang, Sungei Kangkar and Sungei Tengah.

Historical Significance
Although known as a place for fishing and picnicking, the Kranji Reservoir Park is a historical site. A war memorial plaque tells visitors of the historical and violent past of this place. It was here that the Battle of Kranji took place. The Japanese army invaded Kranji in their plan to take Singapore during the Second World War.

Kranji Reservoir Park

In 1985 it became permissible to fish in the Kranji Reservoir Park. The Park now has two fishing areas, named A and B. The greenery around the park has made it a favorite haunt of picnickers.

Incidents
In 2002, a mother and two young children were picking shells from the shores of Kranji Reservoir when the PUB opened up the barrage to let water into the reservoir from the sea. Mother, son and daughter died. PUB later clarified that drownings were not due to the water release as the slow rise in water levels would not cause the trio to be swept off their feet, though it was not established how or why the tragedy happened. Additional precautionary measures have since been implemented such as sounding of a siren and patrol officers using loud hailers to warn people about the impending release of water. Additional warning signs have also been put up cautioning people not to get too near the reservoir.

References

Reservoirs in Singapore
Lim Chu Kang
Sungei Kadut
Western Water Catchment